Sin Kum-ok  (born 25 November 1975,) is a North Korean women's international footballer who plays as a defender. She is a member of the North Korea women's national football team. She was part of the team at the 2003 FIFA Women's World Cup.

International goals

References

1975 births
Living people
North Korean women's footballers
North Korea women's international footballers
Place of birth missing (living people)
2003 FIFA Women's World Cup players
Women's association football defenders
Footballers at the 2002 Asian Games
Asian Games gold medalists for North Korea
Asian Games medalists in football
Medalists at the 2002 Asian Games